East Union may refer to several places in the United States:

 East Union, Kentucky
 East Union, Minnesota
 East Union, Noble County, Ohio, an unincorporated community
 East Union, Wayne County, Ohio, an unincorporated community
 East Union Township, Wayne County, Ohio
 East Union Township, Schuylkill County, Pennsylvania